Khurja super thermal power project or Khurja STPS is a proposed 1320 megawatt, coal-fired supercritical power plant planned to be built at Khurja in Bulandshahr, Uttar Pradesh, India. The project is the first thermal power project by THDC Ltd, projected to cost ₹12676 crores (US$1.8 billion). It is a two unit power plant, with the first unit expected to be  completed by November 2022 and the second by April 2023.

Project
THDC Ltd floated tenders for award of main package in June 2018. Land has been acquired by THDC and project completion is planned by 2023. The coal requirement would be 7.2 million tonnes per annum which will be sourced from the Amelia Coal mines in Madhya Pradesh.

Clearances
The project has been accorded environmental clearance by the Ministry of Environment, Forest and Climate Change (MoEF&CC). The environmental impact assessment report was submitted to MoEF&CC in November 2016.

Capacity
The planned capacity of the thermal power plant is 1320 MW (2 x 660 MW)

References 

Bulandshahr district
Coal-fired power stations in Uttar Pradesh
Khurja
Year of establishment missing